Jinzhan Area is an area and township situated at northeastern corner of Chaoyang District, Beijing, China. It borders Sunhe and Tianzhu Townships to the north, Songzhuang Town to the east, Changying Township to the south, Dongba and Cuigezhuang Townships to the west. The township has a population of 82,756 as of 2020.

According to Tianfu Guangji written during the Ming dynasty, the region was named Jinzhan due to the flowers that grew on a local shallow lake and looked like marigolds.

History

Administrative Divisions 
As of 2021,The area oversees 19 subdivisions, including 6 residential communities and 13 villages:

See also 
 List of township-level divisions of Beijing

References

Chaoyang District, Beijing
Areas of Beijing